Skalski is a Polish surname. Notable people with the surname include:

 Andrzej W. Skalski (1938–1996), Polish entomologist
 James Skalski (born 1998), American football player
 Joe Skalski (born 1964), American baseball player
 Mary Jane Skalski, American film producer
 Stanisław Skalski, Polish fighter ace

Polish-language surnames